Grainfield is a city in Gove County, Kansas, United States.  As of the 2020 census, the population of the city was 322.

History
Grainfield had its start in the year 1879 by the building of the railroad through that territory. It was named for the wheat fields in the vicinity.

The first post office in Grainfield was established in May, 1879.

The Grainfield Opera House is listed on the National Register of Historic Places.

Geography
Grainfield is located at  (39.114101, -100.467540).

Demographics

2010 census
As of the census of 2010, there were 277 people, 127 households, and 84 families residing in the city. The racial makeup of the city was 100.0% White.

There were 127 households, of which 23.6% had children under the age of 18 living with them, 55.9% were married couples living together, 6.3% had a female householder with no husband present, 3.9% had a male householder with no wife present, and 33.9% were non-families. 33.1% of all households were made up of individuals, and 15.8% had someone living alone who was 65 years of age or older. The average household size was 2.18 and the average family size was 2.71.

The median age in the city was 46.2 years. 20.9% of residents were under the age of 18; 7.2% were between the ages of 18 and 24; 20.9% were from 25 to 44; 28.9% were from 45 to 64; and 22% were 65 years of age or older. The gender makeup of the city was 47.3% male and 52.7% female.

2000 census
As of the census of 2000, there were 327 people, 141 households, and 93 families residing in the city. The racial makeup of the city was 97.25% White, 1.53% from other races, and 1.22% from two or more races. Hispanic or Latino of any race were 3.06% of the population.

There were 141 households, out of which 26.2% had children under the age of 18 living with them, 57.4% were married couples living together, 5.0% had a female householder with no husband present, and 34.0% were non-families. 34.0% of all households were made up of individuals, and 21.3% had someone living alone who was 65 years of age or older. The average household size was 2.32 and the average family size was 2.97.

In the city, the population was spread out, with 27.8% under the age of 18, 4.6% from 18 to 24, 21.4% from 25 to 44, 24.2% from 45 to 64, and 22.0% who were 65 years of age or older. The median age was 42 years. For every 100 females, there were 90.1 males. For every 100 females age 18 and over, there were 82.9 males.

The median income for a household in the city was $33,958, and the median income for a family was $44,167. Males had a median income of $29,844 versus $20,625 for females. The per capita income for the city was $17,443. About 9.6% of families and 10.8% of the population were below the poverty line, including 15.8% of those under age 18 and 9.3% of those age 65 or over.

Education
Grainfield is served by USD 292 Wheatland. The Wheatland High School mascot is Thunderhawks.

The Wheatland Shockers and Grinnell Warriors last sports season was in 2005-2006. In the fall of 2006, Wheatland/Grinnell Thunderhawks began.

The Wheatland/Grinnell Thunderhakws won the following Kansas State High school championships:
 2015 Volleyball - 1ADII

The Wheatland Shockers won the following Kansas high school championships:
 1974 Volleyball - Class 2A
 1978 Volleyball - Class 2A
 1980 Boys Cross Country - Class 2A
 1981 Boys Cross Country - Class 1A
 1982 Boys Cross Country - Class 2A
 1982 Volleyball - Class 2A
 1983 Boys Cross Country - Class 1A
 1983 Volleyball - Class 1A
 1983 Girls Cross Country - Class 1A
 1984 Boys Cross Country - Class 1A
 1984 Volleyball - Class 1A
 1984 Boys Track & Field - Class 1A
 1985 Boys Cross Country - Class 1A
 1985 Volleyball - Class 1A
 1986 Boys Cross Country - Class 1A
 1987 Boys Cross Country - Class 2-1A
 1987 Boys Basketball - Class 1A
 1989 Volleyball - Class 1A
 1990 Volleyball - Class 1A
 1991 Volleyball - Class 1A

Gallery

References

Further reading

External links

 Grainfield - Directory of Public Officials
 USD 292, local school district
 Grainfield city map, KDOT

Cities in Kansas
Cities in Gove County, Kansas